Lycée Français International de Tenerife "Jules Verne" is a French international school in Santa Cruz de Tenerife, Spain. A part of the Mission Laïque Française (MiLF) network, it serves maternelle (preschool) through lycée (senior high/sixth form). It offers the "bachibac" (Spanish bachillerato and French baccalaureate).

It was formerly the Collège français Julio-Verne - Mlf.

Notes

External links
 Lycée Français de Tenerife 
 Lycée Français de Tenerife 

Santa Cruz de Tenerife
French international schools in Africa
French international schools in Spain